This is a list of presidents of the Society for the Advancement of Scandinavian Study.
 Thomas A. DuBois (2013–2015)
 Mark Sandberg, University of California, Berkeley (2011–2013)
 Jason Lavery, Oklahoma State University (2009–2011)
 Susan Brantly, University of Wisconsin–Madison (2007–2009)
 Christine Ingebritsen, University of Washington (2005–2007)
 Mary Kay Norseng, University of California, Los Angeles (2003–2005)
 Michael Metcalf, University of Mississippi (2001–2003)
 Ross Shideler, University of California, Los Angeles (1999–2001)
 Jenny Jochens, Towson State University (1997–1999)
 Marianne Kalinke, University of Illinois (1995–1997)
 Terje Leiren, University of Washington (1993–1995)
 Janet E. Rasmussen, Nebraska Wesleyan University (1991–1993)
 Byron J. Nordstrom, Gustavus Adolphus College (1989–1991)
 Birgitta Steene, University of Washington (1987–1989)
 Robert Kvavik, University of Minnesota (1985–1987)
 James E. Cathey, University of Massachusetts (1983–1985)
 H. Arnold Barton, Southern Illinois University at Carbondale (1982–1983)
 Theodore M. Anderson, Stanford University (1981–1982)
 M. Donald Hancock, Vanderbilt University (1980–1981)
 Rose-Marie Oster, University of Colorado (1979–1980)
 Richard F. Tomasson, University of New Mexico(1977–1979)
 Foster Blaisdell Jr., Indiana University (1975–1977)
 H. Peter Krosby, State University of New York (1973–1975)
 Nils Hasselmo, University of Minnesota (1971–1973)
 Niels Ingwersen, University of Wisconsin–Madison (1969–1971)
 Harald Næss, University of Wisconsin–Madison (1967–1969)
 Assar Janzén, University of California, Berkeley (1965–1967)
 Cecil Wood, University of Minnesota (1963–1965)
 P.M. Mitchell, University of Illinois (1961–1963)
 Lee M. Hollander, University of Texas (1959–1961)
 E. Gustav Johnson, North Park College (1958–1959)
 Richard Beck, University of North Dakota (1957–1958)
 Håkan Hamre, University of California, Berkeley (1956–1957)
 Paul Schach, University of Nebraska (1955–1956)
 Gösta Franzén, University of Chicago (1954–1955)
 Joseph Alexis, University of Nebraska (1953–1954)
 Adolph P. Bensen, Yale University (1952–1953)
 Sverre Arestad, University of Washington (1951–1952)
 Richard Beck, University of North Dakota (1950–1951)
 J. Jörgen Thompson, St. Olaf College (1949–1950)
 E. Gustav Johnson, North Park College (1946–1949)
 Carl E. W. L. Dahlström, University of Michigan (1942–1946)
 Richard Beck, University of North Dakota (1940–1942)
 Arthur E. Wald, Augustana College (1938–1940)
 Einar Haugen, University of Wisconsin–Madison (1936–1938)
 George Flom, University of Illinois (1934–1936)
 Henning Larsen, University of Iowa (1931–1934)
 Chester N. Gould, University of Chicago (1929–1931)
 Henning Larsen, University of Iowa (1927–1929)
 Chester N. Gould, University of Chicago (1925–1927)
 Jules Mauritzson, Augustana College (1923–1925)
 Henning Larsen, University of Iowa (1921–1923)
 Lee M. Hollander, University of Wisconsin–Madison (1919–1921)
 A. A. Stromberg, University of Minnesota (1917–1919)
 Chester N. Gould, University of Chicago (1915–1917)
 Jules Mauritzson, Augustana College (1913–1915)
 Julius E. Olson, University of Wisconsin–Madison (1911–1912)

References

Presidents
SASS presidents